Girolamo Cappello (born 13 April 1538) was a Venetian ambassador.

Cappello's first appointment as a Venetian ambassador came in 1567 when he was appointed Ambassador to Austria.  From 1570-1573 he was Ambassador to Savoy, then for a short time Ambassador to Poland, and from 1576-1579 he was Ambassador to France.  He served in some temporary ambassadorships and then was a member of the council that elected the Doge prior to his appointment as Bailo of Constantinople in 1589.

Sources
Eric R. Dursteler. "The Bailo in Constantinople: Crisis and Career in Venice’s Early Modern Diplomatic Corps" in Mediterranean Historical Review; Vol. 16 (2001): 1-25.

1538 births
Year of death missing
Ambassadors of the Republic of Venice to Austria
Ambassadors of the Republic of Venice to France
Ambassadors of the Republic of Venice to Poland
Republic of Venice diplomats
Republic of Venice politicians
Baili of Constantinople
16th-century Italian diplomats
16th-century Venetian people